Berwick is a hamlet in the South Gloucestershire district, in the English county of Gloucestershire. Nearby settlements include the city of Bristol and the village of Hallen. Berwick has a business park called Sampson House Business Park and a wood called Berwick Wood. Berwick is located between the M5 motorway and the M49 motorway. There was a depot for the Government Pipelines and Storage System (GPSS) in the wood.

Hamlets in Gloucestershire
Villages in South Gloucestershire District